Jimmy Dillon (born January 15, 1979) is an American politician who is a Democratic member of the Senate of Pennsylvania. He was elected to represent the 5th senatorial district on May 17, 2022, in a special election to replace incumbent Democrat John Sabatina. He was formerly a School District of Philadelphia grant compliance monitor.

Early life and education
Dillon was born on January 15, 1979 in Northeast Philadelphia. He is a graduate of Holy Ghost Prep and the University of Notre Dame, where he played basketball.

Pennsylvania State Senate
In 2021, Democratic state senator John Sabatina was elected as a judge on the Court of Common Pleas in Philadelphia and resigned his seat on December 31. On January 10, 2022, Democrats selected Dillon's older brother Shawn as their nominee. Shawn later withdrew from the race after facing a legal challenge due to missing candidate filing paperwork and was replaced on the ballot by Dillon, a School District of Philadelphia grant compliance monitor.

A special election was held on May 17; Dillon won with 54% of the vote. He was sworn in on June 7.

References

External links

Living people
Politicians from Philadelphia
21st-century American politicians
1979 births

Democratic Party Pennsylvania state senators
University of Notre Dame alumni